Makeba Riddick-Woods (also known as "Girl Wonder") is an American singer-songwriter who has been active since 2005. She is originally from West Baltimore, Maryland, US. Currently she is managed by Jay-Z's record label and production house, Roc Nation. Their official website describes her as one of the industry's top pop music songwriters and vocal producers.

Background
Riddick attended Baltimore School for the Arts before graduating from Berklee College of Music (Boston) with a bachelor's degree in Music Management. She moved to New York City to develop her career as a songwriter. Her early break came from songwriting and singing background vocals for 3LW, Jennifer Lopez and B2K.

Songwriting and vocal production
Riddick is best known for her work with multi-platinum selling pop artist Rihanna for whom she has vocally produced and collaborated on three albums with including A Girl like Me, Music of the Sun and Good Girl Gone Bad. She co-wrote and vocally produced the star's reggae influenced song "Rude Boy" from Rihanna's fourth studio album, Rated R. She also produced vocals for all the remaining tracks on the album, and co-wrote the intro track "Mad House".

Riddick has also collaborated with French DJ-come producer David Guetta, first the song "If We Ever" which is also her first solo credited vocal performance, taken from Guetta's 2009 Grammy-nominated album One Love. She also worked with Guetta to produce tracks for R&B singer Kelis's album Flesh Tone including the lead single and U.S. Dance Chart topper "Acapella". Riddick's other writing and production credits include Danity Kane's eponymous album; Beyoncé's U.S. radio hit "Get Me Bodied" from her second album B'Day; Braxton's 2005 album Libra and Jennifer Lopez's 2005 album Rebirth as well as platinum-selling work for Mariah Carey. She also worked in the studio with Rodney "Darkchild" Jerkins on material for Diddy - Dirty Money's delayed album Last Train to Paris.

Additionally she has worked on records for the British girl group Sugababes on the song "About a Girl" taken from their seventh studio album Sweet 7. The collaboration reached top ten in the UK. In America Riddick was reunited with Toni Braxton when a record she wrote "Make My Heart" was released by Braxton as the second single from the star's upcoming album Pulse.

Makeba produced Rihanna's vocals for Eminem's single "Love the Way You Lie".

Solo career
She is said to be releasing her own debut solo single titled "Change Up" which will be produced by Darkchild and will serve as the lead single from the producer's collaborative project, The Writersproject Volume 1.

Production and writing credits

Source:
Source:

References

Living people
Berklee College of Music alumni
African-American women singer-songwriters
Musicians from Baltimore
M
21st-century African-American women singers
Cocaine 80s members
Singer-songwriters from Maryland
1981 births